McQuire is an unincorporated community in Frederick County, Virginia, United States. McQuire is located along Hogue Creek at the intersection of the Northwestern Turnpike (U.S. Route 50) and Back Mountain Road (SR 614).

References

Unincorporated communities in Frederick County, Virginia
Unincorporated communities in Virginia
Northwestern Turnpike